Léon Bakst (Leon (Lev) Nikolaevich Bakst) – born as Leyb-Khaim Izrailevich (later Samoylovich) Rosenberg, Лейб-Хаим Израилевич (Самойлович) Розенберг (27 January (8 February) 1866 – 28 December 1924) was a Russian painter and scene and costume designer of Jewish origin. He was a member of the Sergei Diaghilev circle and the Ballets Russes, for which he designed exotic, richly coloured sets and costumes. He designed the décor for such productions as Carnaval (1910), Spectre de la rose (1911), Daphnis and Chloe (1912), The Sleeping Princess (1921) and others.

Early life 
Leyb-Khaim Izrailevich (later Samoylovich) Rosenberg was born in Grodno, into a middle-class Jewish family. As his grandfather was an exceptional tailor, the Tsar gave him a very good position, and he had a huge and wonderful house in Saint Petersburg. Later, when Leyb's parents moved to the capital, the boy Leyb would visit his grandfather's house every Saturday. He said that he had been very impressed as a youth by that house, always returning with pleasure. At the young age of twelve, Lejb won a drawing contest and decided to become a painter. However, the parents disapproved of it and even threw away his paints.

In several years the parents divorced and started new families, it became impossible to live with a step-mother, so the four siblings separated and rented their own place. As the eldest, Lejb was in charge of two sisters and brother, he 'took all kinds of painting work'. After graduating from gymnasium, he studied at the St. Petersburg Academy of Arts as a noncredit student, because he had failed the entry. He also worked part-time as a book illustrator, gaining admission into the Imperial Academy in 1883.

At the time of his first exhibition (1889) he took the surname of Bakst, though the origin of the pseudonym is still unclear. There are at least three versions, according to the main one, his mother's grandmother had the maiden name Bakster. Alexander Benois, a life-long friend of Leon, recalled that 'Leo gave a prolonged and confusing explanation that the surname was taken after some of distant relatives'.

At the beginning of the 1890s, Bakst exhibited his works with the Society of Watercolourists. From 1893 to 1897 he lived in Paris, where he studied at the Académie Julian. He still often visited Saint Petersburg. After the mid-1890s, Bakst became a member of the circle of writers and artists formed by Sergei Diaghilev and Benois, who in 1899 founded the influential periodical Mir iskusstva, meaning "World of Art". His graphics for this publication brought him fame.

Career 

Bakst continued painting, producing portraits of Filipp Malyavin (1899), Vasily Rozanov (1901), Andrei Bely (1905), Zinaida Gippius (1906). He also worked as an art teacher for the children of Grand Duke Vladimir Alexandrovich of Russia. In 1902, he took a commission from Tsar Nicholas II to paint Admiral Avellan and Russian sailors arriving in Paris, a painting he started there, during the celebrations from the 17 to 25 October 1893. However, it took him 8 years to finish this work.

In 1898, he showed his works in the Diaghilev-organized First Exhibition of Russian and Finnish Artists; in World of Art exhibitions, as well as the Munich Secession, exhibitions of the Union of Russian Artists, etc.

Beginning in 1909, Bakst worked mostly as a stage-designer, designing sets for Greek tragedies. In 1908, he gained attention as a scene-painter for Diaghilev with the Ballets Russes.  He produced scenery for Cleopatra (1909), Scheherazade (1910), Carnaval (1910), Narcisse (1911), Le Spectre de la Rose (1911), L'après-midi d'un faune (1912) and Daphnis et Chloé (1912). During this time, Bakst lived in western Europe because, as a Jew, he did not have the right to live permanently outside the Pale of Settlement in the Russian Empire.

Despite being known for his work as a stage designer, art was also commissioned by various English families during the Art Deco era. During this time, he produced such works as the Sleeping Beauty series for James and Dorothy de Rothschild at Waddesdon Manor in 1913. The story is depicted in seven panels that line the walls of an oval, theatrical styled "Bakst room" in the Buckinghamshire manor house.

During his visits to Saint Petersburg, he taught in Zvantseva's school, where one of his students was Marc Chagall (1908–1910). Bakst described Chagall as a favorite, because when told to do something, he would listen carefully, but then he would take his paint and his brushes and do something completely different from the assignment.

In 1914, Bakst was elected a member of the Imperial Academy of Arts. Bakst's comprehensive, many-sided talent showed itself in various areas — he worked as a designer of clothes, set decorations, interiors, textile, etc. Apart from a series of interior designs for the Rothschilds, he also designed exhibitions for ‘Mir Iskusstva’ society and occupied a post of a furniture and interior designer at ‘Sovremennoe Iskusstvo’ (rus. ‘Modern Art’). American silk industry businessman Arthur Selig invited Bakst to create textile design, their collaboration had great success.
During this period his work was widely shown in the United States. Martin Birnbaum, manager of the Berlin Photographic Company in New York City, organized an exhibition of Bakst's work in 1913 in New York that then traveled to Detroit (1913), Buffalo (1914), Cincinnati (1914), Chicago (1914) and Montreal (1914).

After the Revolution of 1917 Leon's sister died from hunger in Russia. When Bakst received the news, he suffered a nervous breakdown, becoming so ill that he couldn't tolerate any irritants such as light, noise, or touch. His servant, Linda, exploited his condition to steal his money — she took all the honoraria that came to the house and intimidated the artist, forcing him to include her and her husband as heirs to his will. By chance he managed to send a note to an influential friend and patron Alice Warder Garrett (1877–1952), an art philanthropist, who helped his sister Sofia rescue Leon. They first met in Paris in 1914, when Mrs. Garrett was accompanying her diplomat husband in Europe, Bakst soon depended upon Garrett as both a confidante and agent.

In 1922, Bakst broke off his relationship with Diaghilev and the Ballets Russes. During this year, he visited Baltimore and, specifically Evergreen House — the residence of his American friend Alice Garrett. Garrett became Bakst's representative in the United States upon her return home in 1920, organizing two exhibitions of the artist's work at New York's Knoedler Gallery, as well as subsequent traveling shows. When in Baltimore, Bakst re-designed the dining room of Evergreen into a shocking acidic yellow and 'Chinese' red confection. The artist transformed the house's small c. 1885 gymnasium into a colourfully Modernist private theatre. This is believed to be the only extant private theatre designed by Bakst.

Léon Bakst was also a prolific writer, his literary legacy in three languages includes novels, numerous publications in magazines, critics, essays, letters to friends and colleagues.

Bakst died on 27 December 1924, in a clinic in Rueil Malmaison, near Paris, from lung problems (oedema). His many admirers amongst the most famous artists of the time, poets, musicians, dancers and critiques, formed a funeral procession to accompany his body to his final resting place, in the Cimetière des Batignolles, in Paris, during a very moving ceremony.

In late 2010, the Victoria and Albert Museum in London presented an exhibit of Bakst's costumes and prints.

Cultural depictions 
 Anna Pavlova, film by Emil Loteanu; portrayed by Igor Dmitriev (1983).

Selected works

See also 
 List of Orientalist artists
 Orientalism
 Place des États-Unis

Citations

General sources 
 Marc Chagall, My Life, St.-Petersburg, Azbuka, 2000, 
 Codell, Julie," Convergences: Art History, Museums and Scholar-Agent Martin Birnbaum's Transatlantic Art for the Public," Art Markets, Agents and Collectors, eds. A. Turpin and S. Bracken. Bloomsbury, 2021, 316-327
 Léon Bakst, Serov et moi en Grèce, translation and introduction by Olga Medvedkova, preface by Véronique Schiltz, TriArtis Editions, 2015, 128 p., 24 illustrations

External links 

 The seven Sleeping Beauty panels at Waddesdon Manor
 
 W.H. Crain Costume and Scene Design Collection at the Harry Ransom Center
 Working for Diaghilev Exhibition at the Groninger Museum
 Léon Bakst (1866–1924) Artwork Images, Exhibitions, Reviews at wwar.com
 An artwork by Léon Bakst at the Ben Uri site
 Works by Léon Bakst at the Russian Art Gallery
 
 Art Signature Dictionary - See Léon Bakst's signature, although the police seizure of counterfeit
 Bakst theatre and performance collection at the Victoria and Albert Museum
 Evergreen Museum and Library - Collection includes original stage sets, costume designs, and other related works.
 Leon Bakst designs, circa 1911–1923, held by the Billy Rose Theatre Division,  New York Public Library for the Performing Arts
 Diaghilev and the Ballets Russes, 1909–1929: When Art Danced with Music 2013 exhibition at the National Gallery of Art in Washington, D.C.
 Bakst collection at the McNay Art Museum

1866 births
1924 deaths
19th-century painters from the Russian Empire
20th-century Russian painters
Art Nouveau painters
Ballet designers
Ballets Russes and descendants
Belarusian Jews
Burials at Batignolles Cemetery
French people of Belarusian-Jewish descent
Emigrants from the Russian Empire to France
Jewish painters
Orientalism
Orientalist painters
People from Grodnensky Uyezd
People from Grodno
Russian costume designers
Russian male painters
Russian scenic designers
Scenographers
Waddesdon Manor